Aphanorrhegma is a genus of moss in the family Funariaceae.  It contains the single species Aphanorrhegma serratum distributed in eastern North America.

References

Funariales
Monotypic moss genera